Garza County is a county located in the U.S. state of Texas. As of the 2020 census, its population was 5,816, of which most of the population were residing in Its county seat, and only incorporated municipality, Post. The county was created in 1876 and later organized in 1907. Garza is named for a pioneer Bexar County family, as it was once a part of that county.

History
Indigenous peoples of the Americas were the first inhabitants of the area, with evidence from around 2000 BC. Later inhabitants were the Kiowa and Comanche.

In 1875, W. C. Young of Fort Worth and Irishman Ben Galbraith of Illinois established the beginnings of the Curry Comb Ranch in the northwestern part of Garza County.

Garza County was formed in 1876 from Bexar County, and named for the prominent Bexar County family of José Antonio de la Garza.

By 1880, the county census count was 36 people.  The Square and Compass Ranch was started 2 years later by the Nave and McCord Cattle Company. They put up the first barbed-wire fence in 1884.  That same year,  OS Ranch was founded by brothers Andrew J. and Frank M. Long of Lexington, Kentucky.
The county's population reached 185 persons by the last year of the 19th century. Post was founded in 1907 as a utopian venture by, and named for, cereal king C.W. Post.  From  1909 to 1913, C.W. Post built a cotton gin and a cotton mill, and attempted to improve agriculture production through rainmaking, involving the heavy use of explosives fired from kites and towers along the rim of the Caprock Escarpment.

In 1926, oil was discovered in the county.  Quanah and Bryan Maxey discovered a 16-foot-long tusk of a prehistoric imperial mammoth in 1934. This tusk is currently located in the American Museum of Natural History, New York City.

In 1957, a prehistoric Indian site was recorded at Cowhead Mesa by Emmet Shedd of Post. In 1960–1965, South Plains Archaeological Society excavations of Cowhead Mesa found artifacts to date inhabitation back to 2000 BC.

The most important businesses in the county by 1980 were agribusiness, oil and gas extraction, and textile mills.

Geography
It is located southeast of Lubbock in the Canyonlands of the Llano Estacado Escarpment.

Major roads and highways
  U.S. Highway 84
  U.S. Highway 380
  State Highway 207
  Farm to Market Road 669

Adjacent counties
 Crosby County (north)
 Dickens County (northeast)
 Kent County (east)
 Scurry County (southeast)
 Borden County (south)
 Lynn County (west)
 Lubbock County (northwest)

Demographics

Note: the US Census treats Hispanic/Latino as an ethnic category. This table excludes Latinos from the racial categories and assigns them to a separate category. Hispanics/Latinos can be of any race.

As of the census of 2000,  4,872 people, 1,663 households, and 1,217 families resided in the county.  The population density was 5 people/sq mi (2/km2).  The 1,928 housing units averaged 2/sq mi (1/km2).  The racial makeup of the county was 56.7% White, 4.8 African American, 0.2% Native American,  0.1% Asian,  17.1% from other races, and 3.00% from two or more races. Hispanics or Latinos of any race were 37.2% of the population.

Of the 1,663 households, 36.0% had children under the age of 18 living with them, 58.5% were married couples living together, 11.2% had a female householder with no husband present, and 26.8% were not families. About 23.8% of all households were made up of individuals, and 12.0% had someone living alone who was 65 or older.  The average household size was 2.65 and the average family size was 3.15.

In the county, the population was distributed as  28.00% under the age of 18, 7.90% from 18 to 24, 28.60% from 25 to 44, 21.30% from 45 to 64, and 14.10% who were 65 years of age or older.  The median age was 35 years. For every 100 females, there were 112.30 males.  For every 100 females age 18 and over, there were 111.30 males.

The median income for a household in the county was $27,206, and for a family was $31,173. Males had a median income of $26,604 versus $18,105 for females. The per capita income for the county was $12,704.  About 17.50% of families and 22.30% of the population were below the poverty line, including 29.6% of those under age 18 and 18.6% of those age 65 or over.

Communities

City
 Post (county seat)

Unincorporated communities
 Close City
 Justiceburg
 Southland

Politics
Republican Drew Springer, Jr., a businessman from Muenster in Cooke County, has since January 2013 represented Garza County in the Texas House of Representatives.

Education
School districts serving the county include:
 Crosbyton Consolidated Independent School District
 Post Independent School District
 Southland Independent School District

The county is in the service area of South Plains College.

See also

 C.W. Post Memorial Camp
 Double Mountain Fork Brazos River
 Duffy's Peak
 Farm to Market Road 669
 Garza County Historical Museum
 National Register of Historic Places listings in Garza County, Texas
 Recorded Texas Historic Landmarks in Garza County
 Mushaway Peak
 Salt Fork Brazos River

References

External links

 Garza County government's website
 Photos of the Llano Estacado 
 
 Garza County Profile from the Texas Association of Counties 

 
1907 establishments in Texas
Populated places established in 1907
Majority-minority counties in Texas